Keith Franke may refer to:

 Adrian Adonis (Keith A. Franke, Jr., 1954–1988), American professional wrestler
 Keith Franke (politician) (born 1970), member of the Minnesota House of Representatives

See also
Keith Frank (born 1972), musician